Pagyda arbiter is a moth in the family Crambidae. It was described by Arthur Gardiner Butler in 1879. It is found on Borneo, China and Japan.

The wingspan is 16–25 mm.

References

Moths described in 1879
Pyraustinae